Heather Unruh (born June 28, 1968) is an American journalist and former television news anchor. She worked for News Center 5 at WCVB for more than fifteen years.

Education 
Unruh is a 1986 graduate of Lincoln High School in Stockton, California and a 1989 graduate of DePauw University.

Career 
Unruh went to WCVB in June 2001 after working at KFOR in Oklahoma City where she was early evening anchor and medical reporter. She has also worked at WVTM-TV in Birmingham, Alabama; both WBNG-TV and WMGC-TV in Binghamton, New York; and WVEU-TV in Atlanta.

Unruh received four regional Emmy Awards for journalism, the Clarion Award from Women in Communications, Inc., and the Gracie Allen Award from the American Women in Radio and Television. Her last airdate was on October 14, 2016, and as of 2017 she was working on documentaries.

Activism 
Unruh is an advocate for lung cancer awareness and has received multiple awards from the American Cancer Society and Uniting Against Lung Cancer.

In 2013, Unruh helped to establish Stand With Everyone Against Rape (SWEAR), a non-profit organization promoting speaking out against rape.

Family 
Unruh is married to Nick Little. They have a son and a daughter.

Accusations against Kevin Spacey 
On November 8, 2017, Unruh held a press conference in Boston, during which she stated that actor Kevin Spacey sexually assaulted her then-18-year-old son in July 2016. The alleged assault occurred at the Club Car restaurant in Nantucket. Unruh's son told police he was texting with his girlfriend throughout the alleged "groping" incident. Spacey spent months trying to obtain copies of the texts and the phone itself. In mid-May 2019, the son's personal attorney informed the court that the cell phone in question is missing. On June 4, 2019, the defense learned that when Heather Unruh gave her son's cell phone to police in 2017, she admitted she had deleted some of the text messages. On June 26, her son filed a lawsuit against Spacey, claiming emotional damages. Two weeks later, her son voluntarily dismissed the claims with prejudice. On July 17, 2019, the criminal assault charge against Spacey were dropped by the Cape and Islands prosecutors.

References

External links 
 

1978 births
American women television journalists
DePauw University alumni
Emmy Award winners
Journalists from Missouri
Living people
People from St. Louis
Television anchors from Boston
21st-century American women